Ruppert Sanderson Jones (born March 12, 1955) is a former Major League Baseball center fielder. He was the first player selected in the 1976 Major League Baseball expansion draft by the Seattle Mariners.

Kansas City Royals
Jones was born in Dallas and moved to California as a pre-teen. He played baseball, basketball and football at Berkeley High School in Berkeley, California, earning all-East Bay honors in each sport. He received scholarship offers to play football at Arizona State University, Oregon State University and the University of California, but opted to focus on baseball as he considered himself a better outfielder than wide receiver.

He was drafted by the Kansas City Royals in the third round of the 1973 Major League Baseball draft. After three seasons in their farm system, in which he batted .287 with 38 home runs and 173 runs batted in, Jones went into Spring training 1976 competing for the open outfield job in right field. Though he had a decent Spring, he was beaten out by Tom Poquette, and reassigned to triple A Omaha just as the regular season was set to begin.

After batting .262 with nineteen home runs and 73 RBIs in half a season with the Omaha Royals, Jones earned a call up to the majors for the second half of the 1976 season. He was the hero of his second major league game, going two-for-five and driving in three runs to lead the Royals to an 8–3 victory over the Chicago White Sox. For the season, he batted .216 with one home run and seven RBIs as a fourth outfielder and left-handed bat off the bench.

Seattle Mariners
Royals manager Whitey Herzog called Jones one of the top three prospects in his team's organization, and realized that they were likely to lose Jones when he was left unprotected in the 1976 expansion draft. However, given the amount of young talent in the organization, Jones did not fit the team's future plans, and was thereby left unprotected. Actor Danny Kaye, who was part owner of the Seattle Mariners, called Jones' name as the first overall pick in the expansion draft.

Jones' power and range in center field immediately made him a fan favorite in Seattle. He was batting .256 with seventeen home runs and fifty RBIs at the All-Star break to be named the first ever All-Star representative of the club at the 1977 game. He ended the season at .263 with 24 home runs and 76 RBIs to be named the 1977 Topps Rookie All-Star center fielder.

On May 16, 1978, Jones tied a major league record for outfielders with twelve putouts in an extra innings game against the Detroit Tigers. His 1978 season was interrupted by an appendectomy in mid June. He returned in late July, but managed just a .214 batting average the rest of the way. For the season he batted .235 with six home runs and 46 RBIs.

He returned healthy in 1979, and established career highs in runs (109), hits (166), triples (9), RBIs (78) and stolen bases (33) while playing a full 162 game schedule. He became the first Mariner to have at least fifteen home runs and stolen bases before the All-Star break; no Mariner would do so again for nineteen years. Following the season, he was traded to the New York Yankees with pitcher Jim Lewis for Rick Anderson, Jim Beattie, Juan Beníquez and Jerry Narron. He left the Mariners with the club record for most runs scored in a season (109 in 1979) and he is tied for club records for runs and walks in a game.

New York Yankees
Jones was batting .223 with nine home runs and 42 RBIs playing center and batting second in the Yankees' line-up when he separated his shoulder on August 25, 1980 crashing into the outfield wall in Oakland–Alameda County Coliseum chasing a Tony Armas fly ball. The Yankees won 103 games that season to win the American League East, however, Jones was unable to appear in the post-season as his injury required season ending surgery. He sued A's owner Charlie Finley after the season.

At one point during the Winter Meetings, Jones was rumored to be heading to the Boston Red Sox in a rare Yankees–Red Sox deal. However, following the Yankees' signing of Dave Winfield as a free agent, the deal fell through. Instead, he was dealt to the San Diego Padres the following Spring with Joe Lefebvre, Tim Lollar and Chris Welsh for Jerry Mumphrey and John Pacella.

San Diego Padres
The Padres finished in last place in both halves of the strike shortened 1981 season. For his part, Jones batted .249 and tied for the team lead with 53 runs scored. He was batting .312 with eleven home runs and fifty RBIs at the 1982 All-Star break to earn the second All-Star nod of his career. He was the Padres' sole representative despite the fact that San Diego was in second place in the National League West at the time. In his only at-bat, he led off the third inning with a triple, and scored on a Pete Rose sacrifice fly. Jones was a fan favorite on the 1982 Padres, and Padre Yellow "Rupe's Troops" T-shirts were a frequent sight during the season.

Jones appeared in 133 games for the Padres in 1983, the fewest he'd played in a full season uninterrupted by injury. He was a free agent at the end of the season, and when the Padres acquired Carmelo Martínez from the Chicago Cubs at the Winter meetings, Jones became expendable.

Detroit Tigers
Jones spent Spring training 1984 with the Pittsburgh Pirates, but failed to make the club. A week into the season, he signed with the Detroit Tigers. He began the season assigned to triple A with the Evansville Triplets; a .313 batting average, nine home runs and 45 RBIs earned him a call up to the majors by the beginning of June. He spent the rest of the season platooning with Larry Herndon in left field and occasionally spelling a day off for Chet Lemon in center. Perhaps his most indelible moment of his season in Detroit came on June 24, when he cleared the right field roof of Tiger Stadium with a shot off Milwaukee Brewers right-hander Tom Tellmann. For the season, Jones batted .284 with 37 RBIs and nine home runs. Six of which came at Tiger Stadium to earn him the nickname "Rooftop" Ruppert.

The 1984 Tigers won 104 games and coasted into the post-season. Jones went hitless in eight at-bats in the American League Championship Series and World Series (in which he faced off against the Padres), winning the Series with the Tigers. He became a free agent at the end of the season. The Tigers believed that he was a part-time player at this stage of his career, and were only willing to pay him as such. After some bitter negotiation between Jones and the Tigers organization, he signed with the California Angels.

California Angels
Jones served as a fourth outfielder and designated hitter his first season in California. His 21 home runs were second only to Reggie Jackson. He and Jackson switched roles in 1986, with Jackson assuming DH duties and Jones earning most of his playing time in right field. The Angels won the American League West that year, earning Jones his second trip to the post-season, but lost the 1986 American League Championship Series to the Boston Red Sox in heart-breaking fashion. Jones collected three hits in the ALCS, scoring four runs and driving in two.

His role became far more diminished in 1987 as he didn't even log his first plate appearance until the eighth game of the season. He ended up with eight home runs and 28 RBIs in just 213 plate appearances.

1988 season
Jones was invited to the Milwaukee Brewers' Spring training camp in Tucson, Arizona as a non-roster invitee in 1988. Though he hit well, he failed to make the club. He signed a minor league deal with the Texas Rangers in the beginning of May, and earned American Association "Player of the Week" honors his second week with the Oklahoma City 89ers. His stay in Oklahoma City, however, was brief. After fifty games, he left for Japan, signing with the Hanshin Tigers. He returned to Oklahoma City in 1989, but with a torn rotator cuff and a torn labrum, he called it quits after 27 games.

Personal life
Jones is divorced from the mother of his daughter and son (Gabrielle and Ranon Jones), and has been married to his second wife, Betty, since 1997. He now lives in Rancho Bernardo, California, a suburb of San Diego, California, and works with The Boon Group, a third-party administrator that sells employee benefits and administrative services to government contractors. He and former major league pitcher Dave Stewart coach the Easton A's, a San Diego-based Travel Ball Team for ages thirteen and fourteen.

References

External links
, or Pura Pelota

1955 births
Living people
African-American baseball players
Águilas del Zulia players
American expatriate baseball players in Japan
American League All-Stars
Baseball players from Dallas
Baseball players from San Diego
Berkeley High School (Berkeley, California) alumni
Billings Mustangs players
California Angels players
Detroit Tigers players
Evansville Triplets players
Hanshin Tigers players
Kansas City Royals players
Major League Baseball center fielders
National League All-Stars
New York Yankees players
Oklahoma City 89ers players
Omaha Royals players
San Diego Padres players
San Jose Bees players
Seattle Mariners players
Tiburones de La Guaira players
American expatriate baseball players in Venezuela
Waterloo Royals players
People from Rancho Bernardo, San Diego
21st-century African-American people
20th-century African-American sportspeople